I Miss the Hip Hop Shop is the debut studio album by Detroit rapper Proof, released on June 15, 2004 via Iron Fist Records.

Diss track 
One of the most notable tracks is "Ja In A Bra" a diss track to rapper Ja Rule for the feud he had with Shady Records which Proof was a part of. Ja Rule also dissed Proof in a freestyle on "It's Murda" by saying "Y'all haven't heard yet that nigga change is 'Loose' and I got "Proof" get it, I got 'Proof'" and on "The Wrap" with "Nah, I'ma give it to you, The same way that we gave it to 'Proof', The same way that we gave it to 'Loose'". The track list was printed wrong on the album, with tracks 8 and 9 being interchanged.

Track listing

Reviews

References

Proof (rapper) albums
2004 debut albums
Albums produced by DJ Premier
Albums produced by J Dilla
Albums produced by Mr. Porter